Jay Clark was the head coach of the women's Georgia gymnastics program at the University of Georgia in Athens, Georgia. Clark was promoted from assistant coach to head coach upon the retirement of long-time coach Suzanne Yoculan after the 2009 season. Clark resigned as Georgia head coach on May 4, 2012.  On July 1, 2012, he was named gymnastics associate head coach and head of recruiting for the LSU Lady Tigers.

Clark is a native of Roswell, Georgia. He graduated from Roswell High School in 1986 and the University of Georgia in 1991. He served as an assistant with the Georgia Gym Dogs from 1990 to 1996 and head team coach and competitive director with the Athens-Clarke Gymnastics Academy from 1996 to 1998. He returned as an assistant coach in 1998 and was promoted to associate head coach in 2004, and head coach in 2009 when Suzanne Yoculan retired after 25 years with the team.

References

Year of birth missing (living people)
Living people
People from Roswell, Georgia
Georgia Gym Dogs coaches
LSU Tigers women's gymnastics coaches
University of Georgia alumni
Sportspeople from Fulton County, Georgia